Cochetopa Dome is a mountain in the San Juan Mountains, in Saguache County, Colorado. The  mountain is located in the Gunnison National Forest.

Geology

Cochetopa Dome is a rhyolitic lava dome, extruded into the Cochetopa caldera approximately 27 million years ago. The Chochetopa caldera is one of over a dozen such collapsed volcanoes within the San Juan volcanic field.
 
The Cochetopa caldera, with Cochetopa Dome within it, is one of the most recognizable of the calderas in the region. Helping preserve the structure of this particular caldera is that its development was more recent than many of the larger calderas elsewhere in the San Juan Mountains, thus there was less regional volcanism to disrupt the caldera's structure. Also, the caldera was only modestly filled with post-subsidence sediments and much of this was weaker, tuffaceaus deposits, which have been more readily eroded from the caldera floor. And lastly, the caldera is drained through Cochetopa Canyon where hard, Precambrian igneous rock has limited down cutting and erosion of the caldera. The present vegetation helps make the caldera's features and extent even more apparent. The floor of the caldera is dominated by grass and shrublands while the caldera rim and the interior lava dome (Cochetopa Dome) are forested. This contrast in vegetation helps a visitor visualize the caldera

Hiking
Private property to the north and west limits access to the mountain. The summit can be reached on public land from the southeast.

See also

List of Colorado mountain ranges
List of Colorado mountain summits
List of the most prominent summits of Colorado
List of Colorado county high points

References

External links

 

San Juan Mountains (Colorado)
Mountains of Saguache County, Colorado
Gunnison National Forest
Mountains of Colorado
Volcanoes of Colorado
Calderas of Colorado